The Middlesex RFU Senior Cup is an annual rugby union knock-out club competition organised by the Middlesex Rugby Football Union.  It was first introduced during the 1971–72 season, with the inaugural winners being Saracens.  It is the most important cup competition organised by the Middlesex RFU ahead of the Senior Bowl and Senior Vase.  The cup was originally open to all sides in Middlesex, including such illustrious names as Harlequins, Saracens and Wasps, but after the 1986–87 season and the incorporation of the Courage Leagues the cup was for limited to the smaller clubs in the county (what were considered 'junior' sides).  

The Senior Cup is currently open to the top 8 club sides based in the historic county of Middlesex (London/Greater London) that typically play between tiers 6–7 of the English rugby union league system – although only 5 sides entered during the 2016–17 competition.  The format is a knockout cup with a first round, semi-finals and a final to be held at one of the finalist's home ground between March–June.

Middlesex Senior Cup winners

Number of wins
Wasps (8)
Ealing Trailfinders (7)
Staines (7)
CS Rugby 1863 (4)
Ruislip (4)
Saracens (4)
London Nigerian (3)
Chiswick (2)
Metropolitan Police (2)
Harlequins (1)
Finchley (1)
Rosslyn Park (1)
Twickenham (1)

Notes

See also
 Middlesex RFU
 Middlesex Senior Bowl
 Middlesex Senior Vase
 English rugby union system
 Rugby union in England

References

External links
 Middlesex RFU

Recurring sporting events established in 1971
1971 establishments in England
Rugby union cup competitions in England
Sport in London
Rugby union in Middlesex